Outer Wilds is a 2019 action-adventure game developed by Mobius Digital and published by Annapurna Interactive. It first released for Windows, Xbox One, and PlayStation 4 before releasing for PlayStation 5 and Xbox Series X/S in 2022. A Nintendo Switch version is also under development. The game features the player character exploring a solar system stuck in a 22-minute time loop that ends with the star going supernova. 

The player progresses through Outer Wilds by exploring the solar system and learning clues to the cause of the time loop. Outer Wilds received critical acclaim and several Game of the Year awards, including at the 16th British Academy Games Awards. The game received an expansion, Echoes of the Eye, in 2021.

Gameplay 
Outer Wilds features an unnamed player character exploring a solar system that is stuck in a time loop, going back 22 minutes before its star goes supernova. Thus, the player is encouraged to learn why by exploring and uncovering secrets of an extinct race known as the Nomai, who previously colonized the solar system hundreds of thousands of years ago. In the first part of the game, the player links with an ancient Nomai statue which ensures that the player retains information discovered in each time loop when it restarts. For example, in order to use the ship, the player must get the launch codes from colleagues at the local observatory. These codes, and the knowledge of them, are the same across subsequent loops, allowing the player to immediately launch the ship without first visiting the observatory.

The central premise of the game is exploration, with the player compelled to uncover the remains of the Nomai civilization to find the cause of the time loop and complete the game. All areas of the game are technically immediately accessible to the player upon acquiring the ship launch codes, however many areas are protected by logic puzzles which can often only be solved through learning more of the Nomai and speaking to fellow space explorers.

Some events and locations change during the course of the time loop, which means that areas and puzzles are often only accessible at certain times. One example is the paired Ash Twin and Ember Twin planets orbiting so close to each other that sand from Ash Twin is funneled over to cover Ember Twin during the loop. This process gradually reveals the secrets buried on Ash Twin while simultaneously making the Ember Twin cave system inaccessible later on in the time loop. 

The player character has health, fuel, and oxygen meters, which are replenished when the character returns to the ship or by finding trees or refills. The player has several tools, including a camera probe which can be launched long distances and a signalscope for locating broadcast signals. There are no equipment upgrades during the game.

After each death, whether the cause is the sun going supernova, or through misadventure — e.g. drowning, falling, exposure to space vacuum — the player respawns and awakens back on their home planet at the start of the time loop.

Plot
The player takes the role of an unnamed space explorer preparing for their first solo flight. After being involuntarily paired with a statue on their home planet made by the Nomai, an ancient and mysterious race that had once colonized the system, the player discovers they are trapped in a time loop. Every loop resets when the sun goes supernova after 22 minutes, or when the player-character otherwise dies.

The player learns that the Nomai were obsessed with finding the "Eye of the Universe", a massive anomaly using macroscopic quantum mechanics that is older than the universe itself. Curious to find out what was held within the Eye, but having lost its signal, the Nomai built an orbital cannon to launch probes to visually find the Eye. The chance of visually finding the object with a random shot into space was infinitesimally small, so they also developed a device, the Ash Twin Project, to send the results of the probe's scan 22 minutes back in time, so that the cannon could be "reused" an infinite number of times. The amount of power required to go back in time was so high that the only viable way of obtaining it would be from a supernova, so they attempted to artificially induce the sun to explode, but were unsuccessful. The Nomai were wiped out by an extinction-level event after completing construction of these projects but before setting the time-loop process into motion. The system is now operating because the sun has naturally reached the end of its life cycle. The resulting supernova feeds power into the Ash Twin Project, conveying the player's memories back in time to their previous self and resetting the cannon for another scan.

Armed with this knowledge, the player is eventually able to recover the coordinates of the Eye and input them into a derelict Nomai interstellar vessel, warping to the Eye's location. They discover that their star is not the only one going supernova. All the stars in the sky have reached the end of their lifespans and the universe is about to end. Upon entering the Eye, the player encounters quantum versions of the various characters they had befriended in their travels, and working together, they create a Big Bang, giving rise to a new universe. The ending shows a similar solar system with new life forms 14.3 billion years after its creation.

Echoes of the Eye
The Echoes of the Eye expansion adds a new exhibit to the observatory at the beginning of the game, which shows off the deep space satellite used to generate the player's solar system map. The player soon discovers an object that eclipses the sun – a planet-sized rotating ship, hidden within a cloaking field. Within this ship, called "the Stranger", the player finds theaters and heavily damaged slide reels that tell the story of the Stranger's inhabitants, an extinct race of owl and elk-like creatures.

Similar to the Nomai, the inhabitants of the Stranger also came to the solar system after discovering the Eye of the Universe's signals, but gave up their quest after seeing that the Eye would destroy the universe and everything in it. After destroying their monuments to the Eye and constructing a device in order to block its signal from other extraterrestrial races, the inhabitants began to regret destroying their homeworld, which they stripped barren in order to build the Stranger. The inhabitants eventually created artifacts and areas where they could sleep in order to enter a virtual reality of their homeworld.

The player learns how to enter the simulation via the use of artifacts and discovers the active consciousness of the inhabitants who are hostile to the player. The player eventually finds archives with more detailed reels of the history of the Stranger's inhabitants, as well as a vault secured by three seals. Using information about glitches within the simulation learned from the archives, the player is eventually able to unlock the vault's three seals and open it, discovering a friendly inhabitant called the Prisoner. Communicating with the player via a telepathic projection staff, the Prisoner transmits a memory where they temporarily disabled the signal blocker surrounding the Eye, causing the other inhabitants to force the Prisoner within the vault, before returning to the simulation and dying in the physical world. The player then uses the staff to explain to the Prisoner how their actions eventually lead the Nomai to discover the signal of the Eye and enter the solar system, setting the events of the game in motion. 

After learning that their actions were not in vain, the Prisoner exits the vault and leaves behind their staff, showing a vision of the Prisoner and player together on a raft, venturing along a river into the sunrise. If the player chooses to travel to the Eye of the Universe after having met with the Prisoner, they find a quantum version of the Prisoner who works with the player to create the new universe.

Development 

Outer Wilds began as Alex Beachum's USC Interactive Media & Games Division master's thesis and grew into a full-production commercial release. He started the project in late 2012 for his yearlong thesis and "Advanced Game Project" assignment. Beachum had previously made a three-dimensional platformer out of Lego bricks as a kid, and was uninterested in a career in games until applying to the Interactive Media program.

Beachum's original ideas were to recreate the Apollo 13 and 2001: A Space Odyssey "spirit of space exploration" in an uncontrollable environment, and to make an objective-less open world game where exploration would satiate the player's questions without feeling "aimless." Beachum took cues from The Legend of Zelda: The Wind Waker non-player characters that would tell tales of distant lands as to entice the player to explore those areas for themselves. The game heavily employs a camping motif, reflecting Beachum's personal interest in backpacking while also emphasizing that the player-character is far from their home and alone in this galaxy. While journalists have compared Outer Wilds time loop mechanics to that of The Legend of Zelda: Majora's Mask, Beachum notes that these mechanics are used in Outer Wilds primarily "to allow the creation of large-scale dynamic systems" as opposed to "play[ing] around with causality" as in Majora's Mask.

The original development team members were University of Southern California, Laguna College of Art and Design, and Atlantic University College students. Beachum's team started by working with "paper prototypes" and a "tabletop role-playing session" to brainstorm a narrative. The team built the game in the Unity3D game engine. They later wrote the game as a text adventure in Processing. After Beachum's graduation, the project hired members full-time to work towards a commercial release, with Beachum as creative director. Japanese actor Masi Oka, who has had previous experience as a programmer and founded Mobius Digital to develop mobile games, had seen the demo of Outer Wilds during a demo day for the USC Interactive Media & Games groups. Oka saw the opportunity to expand his team and hired the entire team behind the game into his studio to help bring the title to development. The game became the first title to be supported on the new video game-centric crowdfunding site, Fig, launched in August 2015. An alpha release version of the game was made available for free on the developer's site in 2015.

In March 2018, Mobius announced it had received funding support from publisher Annapurna Interactive, which bought out the investment and rights from Fig, and that it was planned for release in 2018. Mobius later announced plans in June 2018 to also release the game for the Xbox One. In December 2018, it was announced that the game's release would be delayed until 2019. In exchange for additional financial support, Mobius announced that the game's initial release on PC users would be a timed-exclusive on the Epic Games Store. As it was originally announced that Fig backers would have received redemption keys on Steam for the game, some backers complained about the change; Linux users noted that as the Epic Games Store does not have a Linux-compatible front end, the change left them without any option.

Outer Wilds was released on PC on May 28, 2019, and for Xbox One a day later. A PlayStation 4 version was released on October 15, 2019, with a Steam release on June 18, 2020. A PlayStation 4 retail version was released by Limited Run Games in 2020. A Nintendo Switch port was originally set for a mid-2021 release, before being delayed indefinitely. An expansion, Echoes of the Eye, was released on September 28, 2021. Performance update patches were released for the Xbox Series X/S and PlayStation 5 versions on September 15, 2022.

Reception 

Outer Wilds received "generally favorable" reviews, according to review aggregator Metacritic. At the 2015 Game Developers Conference-sponsored Independent Games Festival, Outer Wilds won in the Seumas McNally Grand Prize and Excellence in Design categories. It was an honorable mention in the Excellence in Narrative and Nuovo Award categories. The game was listed as one of the best games of 2019 by several publications, and Edge, Polygon and Paste also featured it on their "best games of the decade" lists.

Polygon Colin Campbell praised the overall narrative and the game's meta-puzzles. Brendan Caldwell, writing for Rock, Paper, Shotgun, enjoyed the environmental exploration and the game's writing, but criticized that running out of time during some puzzles felt like "an interruption". Destructoid Josh Tolentino appreciated the open ended nature of Outer Wilds world and how it let the player make discoveries.

Awards

References

Further reading

External links 

 

2019 video games
Action-adventure games
Annapurna Interactive games
British Academy Games Award for Best Game winners
British Academy Games Award for Game Design winners
Golden Joystick Award winners
Independent Games Festival winners
Indie video games
Nintendo Switch games
Open-world video games
PlayStation 4 games
Science fiction video games
Seumas McNally Grand Prize winners
Single-player video games
Video games about extraterrestrial life
Video games about time loops
Video games developed in the United States
Video games set on fictional planets
Video games with 6 degrees of freedom
Windows games
Xbox Cloud Gaming games
Xbox One games